Trigonopterus pararugosus is a species of flightless weevil in the genus Trigonopterus from Indonesia.

Etymology
The specific name is derived from the Greek word para-, meaning "next to", combined with the specific name of the related species T. rugosus.

Description
Individuals measure 2.16–2.38 mm in length.  Body is slightly oval in shape.  General coloration is black, with rust-colored antennae and legs.

Range

Phylogeny
T. pararugosus is part of the T. saltator species group.

References

pararugosus
Beetles described in 2014
Beetles of Asia
Insects of Indonesia